The Love Specialist is an Italian-French movie filmed in 1958, and released in the U.S. in 1959 with the title The Love Specialist.

Plot 
Diana Dixon, a Texan girl (played by Dors), wins a quiz show jackpot, and uses her winnings (a prize in cash and a brand new Cadillac car) for a trip to Italy. Her car breaks down near Siena where she meets Prince Piero di Montalcino (Gassman), a handsome Italian nobleman. He believes that she must be rich, and she also thinks that he must be wealthy, but that's very far from the truth. 

The romance reaches its climax at the traditional Palio horse race where, after Diana breaks up with the prince upon hearing that he bribed the jockey of the rival contrada into throwing the race so that his horse could win, she fast-talks the rival horse's owner into letting her ride. After winning the Palio, she will accept to marry the Prince.

Cast
 Diana Dors - Diana Dixon
 Vittorio Gassman - Piero di Montalcino
 Franca Valeri - Contessa Bernardi
 Bruce Cabot - Mike
 Teresa Pellati - Laura
 Tina Lattanzi - Madre di Piero
 Enrico Viarisio - Il zio di Piero
 Nando Bruno - Papà ferrari
 Ronaldo Bonacchi - Tino

Production
The film was based on a novel which was published in 1957/

The film was known as The Girl from Palio or The Girl Who Rode the Padlio. The casting of Dors and Gassman was announced in April 1957. Dors was one of a number of English and American stars making movies in Italy - others included Mamie Van Doren and Steve Reeves.

Dors arrived in Rome in July 1957.

Many of the extras for the horse race scenes were real jockeys, some of which quite known to the Sienese. One of them, Pietro De Angelis (nicknamed "Pietrino"), winner of two previous Palio races, died of a heart attack while the movie was being filmed in August.

The movie was also a springboard for the career of the sole woman jockey of the modern Palio horse race, Rosanna Bonelli, nicknamed "Diavola" but better known as "Rompicollo" ("breakneck") from the name of an operetta written by her father. She raced first in a mock Palio race staged for the shooting crew, in place of the jockey of the "Pantera" team (unbeknownst to the film production) and then as a stuntwoman for Ms. Dors in the victory scenes, riding the mare Gaudenzia. That helped the girl's rise to local fame and to crown her dream to run in the real Palio race of August 16, 1957 racing for the "Aquila" team, her first and last race on Siena's scenic Piazza del Campo, and although she didn't finish in first place like the film's heroine, she was bestowed the title of "honorary jockey" by the "contrada".

Filming was completed by October. Dors and Gassman were to be reunited in Strange Holiday.

Reception
Variety called it "colorful, splendidly lensed."

The Monthly Film Bulletin called it "sheer pulp fiction".

Filmink called it "a gorgeous-looking movie, incidentally, in which Dors never appeared more beautiful on screen; there’s also a climax where she gets to win a horse race, the Palio di Siena – more of a triumphant finale than British cinema ever gave her. However, the film was little seen outside Europe."

References

External links

https://www.bfi.org.uk/films-tv-people/4ce2b6bf218b4 The Love Specialist] at BFI
The Love Specialist at TCMDB

1958 films
1958 comedy films
1950s Italian-language films
English-language Italian films
English-language French films
1950s English-language films
Films directed by Luigi Zampa
Films set in Siena
Films set in Tuscany
Films scored by Renzo Rossellini
1950s multilingual films
French multilingual films
Italian multilingual films